Mycoplasma synoviae is a species of bacterium in the genus Mycoplasma. It causes disease in the joints, bones and respiratory system of birds. It is found throughout the world and infection may be referred to as infectious synovitis, avian mycoplasmosis, infectious sinusitis, or mycoplasma arthritis. It is of economic importance because infection can cause a drop in egg production. The disease is most commonly seen in chickens, and transmission occurs both vertically and horizontally.

Clinical signs & diagnosis
Common clinical signs include lameness, a stiff gait, and abnormal curvature of the limbs. Respiratory and neurological signs are also reported. As mentioned, a drop in egg production often occurs.

A preliminary diagnosis can be made based on history, clinical exam, and postmortem signs. Bacterial culture, immunofluorescence, PCR, ELISA, or slide agglutination tests (SAT) can be used to make a more definitive diagnosis.

Treatment & control
Mycoplasma synoviae is treated with antibiotics, but resistance to some types is reported. Specific antibiotic treatment is available for eggs.

The disease is controlled with vaccination.

See also
 Mycoplasma

References
Mycoplasma synoviae, expert reviewed and published by Wikivet at http://en.wikivet.net/Mycoplasma_synoviae, accessed 13/09/2011.

External links
Type strain of Mycoplasma synoviae at BacDive -  the Bacterial Diversity Metadatabase

Bird diseases
Bacterial diseases
synoviae